Bhildi is a town in Deesa, Banaskantha district, Gujarat, India.

Geography
Bhiladiyaji

Jain Thirth
Bhiladiyaji Jain Temple located here is very ancient which was much renovated in last decade. The temple of Bhiladiyaji Teerth is dedicated to Lord Parshvanatha. Here the lord is known as Shri Bhiladia Parshvanath Bhagavan. The temple stands as a unique example of ancient art and architecture. It is two storied and is adorned with three peaks. The idol of the Lord is of black in colour and is 53 cm in height. It is seated in a padmasana posture.

Transport 
Bhildi is an important railway junction on the Western Railway network and connected to Kandla port and Mundra port via Gandhidham. It provides direct connectivity to Jodhpur, Palanpur WDFC and Ahemdabad from these Arabian sea ports. Many long distance trains pass through Bhildi now as a new direct link to Ahemdabad via Patan has been commissioned in 2019, which also connects to existing western Rajasthan rail-line.

See also 
 Railway stations in India

References

External links 
 About Bhildi
 Satellite image of Bhildi

Cities and towns in Banaskantha district